Brian McNamara is an American actor. His first major role was in the film The Flamingo Kid (1984). He then went on to appear in a few films, such as Short Circuit (1986), Caddyshack II (1988), Arachnophobia (1990) and Mystery Date (1991).

McNamara was nominated for a Golden Globe Award for playing Dean Karny in the television film Billionaire Boys Club (1987). However, his most popular role was as Michael Holden in the television series Army Wives (2007–2013).

Career
Early in his career, he played Todd Young in Caddyshack II (1988). He had roles in such feature films as Arachnophobia and Short Circuit. He guest starred in such television series as NYPD Blue, The O.C., Seinfeld, St. Elsewhere, JAG, Ned & Stacey, Star Trek: Voyager, Mad About You, Matlock, Diagnosis: Murder, Ellen, Murder, She Wrote, Murphy Brown, The Suite Life of Zack & Cody, CSI: Cyber, and Army Wives. He starred in the 2000 television movie A Diva's Christmas Carol.

One of his earliest roles was as Greg, Alex Keaton's friend who is killed in a car accident in the 1987 Family Ties episode "A, My Name Is Alex" for which the writer won an Emmy Award. He had a lead role in the short-lived 1989 NBC sitcom The Nutt House. He also starred in the Disney sci-fi tele-movie Earth Star Voyager and had a lead role on the television series Manhattan, AZ in 2000. He had a starring role in the film The Legend of Tillamook's Gold. Most recently, McNamara had a starring role as General Holden, husband of Claudia-Joy Holden (Kim Delaney), on the Lifetime series Army Wives (2007-2013).

McNamara guest starred in 2009 Ghost Whisperer (s4e14) as Douglas Marks. He also appeared in the 2010 NCIS: Los Angeles episode "Little Angels" and was in the full motion video game Silent Steel in 1995.

Filmography

Video Games

References

External links

American male film actors
American male television actors
Living people
20th-century American male actors
21st-century American male actors
Place of birth missing (living people)
Year of birth missing (living people)